Katihar railway division is one of the five railway divisions under Northeast Frontier Railway zone of Indian Railways. This railway division was formed on 15 January 1958 and its headquarter is located at Katihar in the state of Bihar of India.

Alipurduar railway division, Lumding railway division, Tinsukia railway division and Rangiya railway division are the other four railway divisions under NFR Zone headquartered at Maligaon, Guwahati.

List of railway stations 
The list includes the stations  under the Katihar railway division and their station category.

Stations closed for Passengers -

State Wise Route KMs

See also
Indian Railways
Rail transport in India
Katihar Junction railway station
Zones and divisions of Indian Railways

References

External links
SYSTEM MAP OF  KATIHAR DIVISION

 
Divisions of Indian Railways
1958 establishments in Bihar